Yellowhead is a federal electoral district in Alberta, Canada, that has been represented in the House of Commons of Canada since 1979. The district is in west-central Alberta and represents: parts of the Municipal District of Greenview No. 16 including Grande Cache, Improvement District No. 25 (Willmore), the Improvement District No. 12 (Jasper), the Municipality of Jasper, Yellowhead County including Hinton and Edson, Brazeau County including Drayton Valley, Lac Ste. Anne County including Alexis 133, Parkland County, Leduc County, Clearwater County including Big Horn 144A, Sunchild 202, and O'Chiese 203, and Rocky Mountain House.

History
The electoral district was created in 1976 from Rocky Mountain, Athabasca, Edmonton West, Pembina, and Wetaskiwin ridings.

Its most high-profile MP has been Joe Clark, who was Prime Minister in late 1979 and early 1980 and a prominent cabinet and opposition figure.

This riding lost territory to Peace River—Westlock and Sturgeon River—Parkland, and gained territory from Wetaskiwin and Wild Rose during the 2012 electoral redistribution.

Following the 2013 redistribution, portions of this electoral district (notably the town of Whitecourt) joined the newly formed riding of Peace River—Westlock while the regions of Leduc County and Rocky Mountain House were added to Yellowhead.

Demographics
According to the Canada 2011 Census

Ethnic groups: 85.3% White, 11.7% Aboriginal, 1.0% Filipino 
Languages: 90.5% English, 2.6% French, 1.7% German 
Religions: 58.5% Christian (20.6% Catholic, 10.3% United Church, 4.3% Anglican, 4.2% Lutheran, 2.1% Baptist, 1.9% Pentecostal, 15.3% Other Christian), 1.0% Traditional Aboriginal Spirituality, 39.7% No religion 
Median income (2010): $34,679

Riding associations 
Riding associations are the local branches of political parties:

Members of Parliament

This riding has elected the following Members of Parliament:

Election results

See also
 List of Canadian federal electoral districts
 Past Canadian electoral districts

References

 
 Expenditures - 2008
 Expenditures - 2004
 Expenditures - 2000
 Expenditures - 1997

Notes

External links
 Elections Canada
 Website of the Parliament of Canada
 Federal Electoral District Redistribution report

Alberta federal electoral districts
Edson, Alberta
Hinton, Alberta